Ayres is a surname. Notable people with the surname include:

Agnes Ayres (1898–1940), American silent film actor
Alice Ayres (1859–1885), English nursemaid, honored for rescuing her three nieces from a burning building at the cost of her own life
Anne Ayres (1816–1886), American Episcopalian nun
Benjamin Ayres (born 1977) an actor, director, photographer
Benjamin Ayres (instrument maker) (died c. 1775), an English instrument maker
Bill Ayres, American radio talk show host, co-founder and executive director of World Hunger Year
Caroline Ayres (born 1981), English basketball player
Christopher Ayres (1965–2021), American voice actor
Clara Ayres (1880–1917), American nurse during the First World War
Clarence Edwin Ayres (1891–1972), American economist
David Ayres (born 1977), Canadian ice hockey goaltender
David Ayres (soldier) (1841–1916), Union Army Medal of Honor recipient
Ed Ayres (disambiguation), multiple people
Gary Ayres (born 1960), Australian rules footballer and coach
Gillian Ayres (1930–2018), British painter
Greg Ayres (born 1968), American voice actor
Harry Ayres (footballer) (1920–2002), British footballer
Harry Ayres (mountaineer) (1912–1987), New Zealand guide and mountaineer
Ian Ayres (born 1959), American professor at Yale Law School and Yale School of Management
Ian Ayres (filmmaker), American filmmaker
João Maria Correia Ayres de Campos, 1st Count of Ameal (1847–1920), Portuguese humanist, politician and art-collector
José Márcio Ayres (1954–2003), Brazilian primatologist and conservationist
Leonard Porter Ayres (1879–1946), American statistician
Lew Ayres (1908–1996), American actor
Lewis Ayres, lay Catholic theologian
Pam Ayres (born 1947), British writer of humorous poetry
Philip Ayres (poet) (1638–1712), English poet
Philip Burnard Ayres, British physician and botanist
Richard Ayres (born 1965), British composer
Robert Ayres (disambiguation), multiple people
Romeyn B. Ayres (1825–1888), Union general in the American Civil War
Rosalind Ayres (born 1946), British actress
Stuart Ayres (born 1980), Australian politician
Thomas Ayres (artist) (1816–1858), California gold rush-era artist
Thomas Ayres (ornithologist) (1828–1913), British-born South African ornithologist
Thomas E. Ayres (born 1962), American military lawyer
Vernon Ayres (1908–1968), Canadian ice hockey player
William Orville Ayres (1817–1887), American physician and ichthyologist

See also
 Ayer (surname)
Edward L. Ayers, American historian and educator

English-language surnames